El embarcadero (The Pier) is a Spanish drama television series created by Álex Pina and Esther Martínez Lobato. It was produced by Atresmedia Studios and Vancouver Media for Movistar+. The first season was released on Movistar+ on 18 January 2019., the second and final season, consisting of 8 episodes, was released on 17 January 2020.

Premise
Alejandra (Verónica Sánchez) is a high-profile architect in Valencia who is shattered by the secrets left behind by the death of Óscar, her husband of 15 years. She discovers he was leading a double-life with another woman, Veronica, in a nearby village in the Albufera lagoon. She decides to approach the woman under another identity to discover why her husband lived a lie and what really happened on the fateful night of his death.

The series is set in city of Valencia and the nearby Albufera.

Cast
 Álvaro Morte as Óscar
 Verónica Sánchez as Alejandra
 Irene Arcos as Verónica
 Roberto Enríquez as Conrado
 Marta Milans as Katia
 Judit Ampudia as Ada
 Antonio Garrido as Big Boss
 Miquel Fernández as Fran
 Paco Manzanedo as Vicent
 with Cecilia Roth as Blanca

Episodes

Season 1

Season 2

Awards and nominations 

|-
| align = "center" rowspan = "3" | 2019 || rowspan = "3" | 7th  || colspan = "2" | Best Drama Series ||  || rowspan = "3" | 
|-
| Best Drama Actress || Irene Arcos || 
|-
| Best Drama Actor || Álvaro Morte || 
|-
| align = "center" | 2020 || 29th Actors Union Awards || Best New Actress || Irene Arcos ||  || align = "center" | 
|}

References

External links
 
 

2019 Spanish television series debuts
2020 Spanish television series endings
Spanish-language television shows
Television shows set in the Valencian Community
Spanish LGBT-related television shows
2010s Spanish drama television series
2020s Spanish drama television series
Television shows filmed in Spain
Television series by Vancouver Media